No Greater Love, also known as Danielle Steel's No Greater Love, is a 1996 American made-for-television romantic drama film directed by Richard T. Heffron. The film is based upon the 1991 novel of the same name written by Danielle Steel.

Plot 
One night, the ship hits an iceberg and soon starts to sink. While heading to the life boats, panic breaks out and Alexis is nowhere to be found. Kate convinces Edwina to go into a boat with Teddy and stays behind herself to look for Alexis. Edwina, George and Teddy soon find out that Alexis has survived the disaster, but that their parents and Charles didn't.

Upon arriving in Boston, Edwina tries to adjust to a normal life, but the traumatic experience has a great effect on her. She is advised to send the children away to their aunt, but she is determined to raise them alone, not wanting to neglect the family newspaper company. George is planning on dropping out of high school to become a theater director and Alexis runs away from home for a night when she learns that her mother had a chance to go on a lifeboat, but chose to stay with her husband. Edwina refuses a proposal from a man named Ben Jones, explaining she still isn't over the death of her fiancée. Ten years go by. George was forced to go to Harvard University and later had to take over the newspaper. Edwina is mad at him for ignoring his responsibilities for the theater. She eventually decides to sell the newspaper and allows George to follow his dream and become a professional stage director.

At the premiere of George's first professional play, Edwina meets Sam Horowitz, the father of Helen Horowitz, the lead actress George is in love with. Alexis is seduced by the older womanizing actor Malcolm Stone, much to the distress of Edwina. The rebellious Alexis doesn't stop seeing him and she accompanies him to nightclubs, where she is introduced to cocaine. Edwina tries to break them up, but this only leads to an estrangement from her. On the day of George and Helen's marriage ceremony, she runs away from home. Edwina follows her to England and aboards a ship for the first time since the disaster. She initially refuses to leave her cabin, afraid of the memories.

The first time on the deck, she meets Englishman Patrick Kelly. He immediately shows interest in her, but she is still reluctant to allow herself to love someone. In London, they spend all their time looking for Alexis and find out she is heading to Paris for the weekend. In the meantime, she agrees to stay with Patrick and they give in to their feelings for each other. Although knowing he is a married man, she spends a few nights with him and then reluctantly leaves him. She eventually locates Alexis and finds out she is married to Malcolm. She threatens to sue him for kidnapping and rape and tries to convince Alexis to go with her. Before leaving with her, Alexis admits that Malcolm drugged her. Back in Boston, the Winfield family is finally reunited and George and Helen announce they will have a baby. Edwina stops being mad at her mother for not going into a lifeboat and she is courted by Sam.

Cast
Kelly Rutherford as Edwina Winfield
Chris Sarandon as Sam Horowitz
Nicholas Campbell as Malcolm Stone
Daniel Hugh Kelly as Ben Jones
Michael Landes as George Winfield
Gina Philips as Alexis 'Lexie' Winfield
Simon MacCorkindale as Patrick Kelly
Christopher C. Fuller as Charles Fitzgerald
Carole Ruggier as Carpathia Stewardess
Susan Hogan as Kate Winfield
Daniel Pilon as Bert Winfield
Sarah Freeman as Six-year-old Alexis Winfield
Hayden Christensen as Teddy Winfield
Polly Shannon as Helen Horowitz

Production
Filming took place in Montreal and Los Angeles. All of the special effects scenes featuring the RMS Titanic that did not include any of the main cast members were edited from S.O.S. Titanic (1979). However, scenes from A Night to Remember (1958) and Munster, Go Home! (1966) were edited into the film as well.

See also
List of films about the RMS Titanic

References

External links

1996 television films
1996 romantic drama films
NBC network original films
1996 films
American romantic drama films
Films based on American novels
Films set in the 1910s
Films set in the 1920s
Films about RMS Titanic
NBC Productions films
Films directed by Richard T. Heffron
Films based on works by Danielle Steel
Films shot in Montreal
Films shot in Los Angeles
Films scored by Billy Goldenberg
American drama television films
1990s American films